Blue Lakes, California may refer to:

 Blue Lakes (California), a string of lakes in Lake County, California
 Blue Lake, California, a city in Humboldt County, California
 Midlakes, California, a settlement in Lake County, California, formerly known as Blue Lakes